David Lee Lemonds (born July 5, 1948) is an American former professional baseball player, a left-handed pitcher who played in the Major Leagues in  and  for the Chicago Cubs and Chicago White Sox. Lemonds appeared in 33 Major League games, all but two of them for the 1972 White Sox. He started 19 games, and in 99⅓ innings recorded 69 strikeouts and allowed 92 hits and 43 bases on balls. He retired after the 1974 minor league baseball season.

Lemonds played on the Charlotte Post 9 (American Legion) team that advanced to back to back championship games, in 1964 and 65. Post 9, coached by his father Jack, won the Legion national championship in 1965.

Lemonds, then went on to play for the University of North Carolina, where he was named first team All American,  and Sporting News Player of the Year in 1968. UNC retired his number.  He was drafted in 1966 by the San Francisco Giants during the 5th round but did not sign.  He was drafted in the 1968 Amateur Draft (June Secondary) as the first pick in the first round by the Chicago White Sox.

He was traded along with Roe Skidmore and Pat Jacquez by the Cubs to the White Sox for Ossie Blanco and José Ortiz on November 30, 1970.

References

External links

1948 births
Major League Baseball pitchers
Chicago Cubs players
Chicago White Sox players
Raleigh-Durham Phillies players
Tacoma Cubs players
San Antonio Missions players
Iowa Oaks players
Wichita Aeros players
Tucson Toros players
Living people
Baseball players from North Carolina